Archibald Query (1873–1964) was a Canadian-born American confectioner, who invented Marshmallow Fluff, a special formula of marshmallow cream, in 1917.

Biography
Query developed the recipe in his kitchen, initially selling his marshmallow fluff door-to-door. With the advent of World War I there were serious shortages of sugar, one of the basic ingredients in his recipe. With his business faltering, Query sold his formula to two partner candymakers H. Allen Durkee and Fred Mower.  When mixed with peanut butter, it is the primary ingredient in a sandwich known as a Fluffernutter.

He was a resident of Somerville, Massachusetts, where he lived at 106 Bromfield Road.

Joseph Archibald Query died in Boston on March, 1964, aged 90. (Massachusetts Death Record)

See also

 Marshmallow Fluff

References

External links

 Inventor of the Week at MIT.edu

1873 births
1963 deaths
20th-century American inventors
People from Montreal
People from Somerville, Massachusetts
Vermont Academy alumni
Canadian emigrants to the United States